is a Japanese manga series written and illustrated by Kakeru Sato. It was serialized in Shueisha's seinen manga magazine Weekly Young Jump from September 2015 to June 2016.

Publication
Written and illustrated by Kakeru Sato, Gravuretry was serialized in Shueisha's seinen manga magazine Weekly Young Jump from September 10, 2015, to June 30, 2016. Shueisha collected its chapters in four tankōbon volumes, released from February 19 to July 19, 2016.

Volume list

References

Further reading

Seinen manga
Shueisha manga